Music and Money (Spanish:Música y dinero) is a 1958 Mexican musical comedy film directed by Rafael Portillo and starring Tito Guízar, Luis Aguilar and Pedro Vargas.

The film's sets were designed by the art director Manuel Fontanals.

Cast
 Luis Aguilar 
 Alejandro Algara 
 Tony Carbajal 
 Abel Cureño
 Mario Gil 
 Tito Guízar 
 Rebeca Iturbide 
 Irving Lee 
 Gloria Mestre  
 Jorge Mondragón 
 Eduardo Noriega 
 Rosina Pagã 
 Dámaso Pérez Prado 
 Manuel Trejo Morales
 Jorge Treviño 
 Pedro Vargas

References

Bibliography 
 Rogelio Agrasánchez. Cine Mexicano: Posters from the Golden Age, 1936-1956. Chronicle Books, 2001.

External links 
 

1958 films
1958 musical comedy films
Mexican musical comedy films
1950s Spanish-language films
Films directed by Rafael Portillo
1950s Mexican films